The James Alexis Darling House is a historic house at 1932 Litchfield Turnpike (Connecticut Route 69) in Woodbridge, Connecticut.  Built in 1842 for a grandson of Thomas Darling (whose house stands nearby), it is a good example of a rural Greek Revival farmhouse.  Although built with the latest exterior styling, its construction style harkens back to 18th-century building practices.  James Alexis Darling worked in the family mercantile business and moved to Woodbridge to oversee his grandfather's farm.

The house was listed on the National Register of Historic Places in 2020.

See also
National Register of Historic Places listings in New Haven County, Connecticut

Notes

Woodbridge, Connecticut
Houses on the National Register of Historic Places in Connecticut
National Register of Historic Places in New Haven County, Connecticut
Houses in New Haven County, Connecticut